Shangqing Bridge is an overpass in Beijing.

It is an intersection where the northern stretch of the 5th Ring Road and the Badaling Expressway meet.

Before tolls on the 5th Ring Road were abolished in early 2004, the bridge received little attention, apart from being the bridge where the first stretch of the 5th Ring Road was opened to traffic. However, as of 2004, it has become a major focus point, as the bridge is, more often than not, home to stunning traffic jams.

The problem is that vehicles switching expressways must pick up an entry card when heading in either direction. For cars heading toward the Badaling Expressway from the 5th Ring Road (especially if they are heading towards central Beijing), it is not a big problem (cards are handed and handed back to the Qinghe toll gate, where drivers heading into central Beijing continue without paying a cent; cards are also handed back to a toll gate on the Badaling Expressway if the driver heads out of Beijing). However, the problem is significant for cars entering the 5th Ring Road from the Badaling Expressway, where tolls must be paid before the vehicle enters the 5th Ring Road.

The heart of the problem is that the two longer parts of the bridge stretching into the 5th Ring Road consist of only one drivable lane. As a result, long lines at Shangqing Bridge are routine.

Because of this, it is not uncommon to see the two parts of Shangqing Bridge stretching into the 5th Ring Road jam-packed with vehicles. Unfortunately the toll gate problem is difficult to solve as there is only one lane to the toll gate, and the 5th Ring Road was never designed as a toll-free express road, but as a standard expressway (with tolls).

A few months into 2004, the authorities banned lorries over 2 t in weight from the bridge, for fear that Shangqing Bridge might collapse, due to the enormous weight of the vehicles.

On September 16, 2004, further actions were taken. Lorries heading for the eastern stretch of the N. 5th Ring Road (if coming into Beijing) were simply to be denied access and this included buses as well (apparently, the bridge has too much stress on it). All affected traffic is rerouted using the 6th Ring Road, placing longer travel routes and more tolls on the drivers. All lorries over 2 t can only enter areas inside of the 6th Ring Road during the night.

This measure, although easy to dismiss as extreme, actually takes a fair bit of credit. Lorries stockpiling on the bridge is a scene reserved now only during peak hours (previously, it was virtually any time of the day). Although the very issue of traffic jams is yet to be fully solved, the measure is a step towards solving it. Meanwhile, the bridge is further saved from collapse.

Despite this, public opinion is rather negative on the traffic situation at Shangqing Bridge. Calls for the repositioning of the toll gates and the addition of further toll gates have been mounting upon Shoufa, the expressway company. The authorities and Shoufa respond by saying that technical and physical constraints are the major obstacle. Still, the problem is mitigated with the addition of a few more toll gates—although only in a line (vertically instead of horizontally).

To solve the problem, some toll officials now collect tolls by actually walking to cars in the line and collecting tolls and handing over receipts. This somewhat alleviates the problem, even though the core of the problem is still existent to this day.

See also
 5th Ring Road (Beijing)
 Badaling Expressway

References

Bridges in Beijing
Road bridges in China
Toll bridges in China